The 2014 Evian Championship was played 11–14 September at the Evian Resort Golf Club in Évian-les-Bains, France. It was the 21st Evian Championship (the first 19 played as the Evian Masters), and the second as a major championship on the LPGA Tour. The event was televised by Golf Channel and NBC Sports in the United States and Sky Sports in the United Kingdom.

Kim Hyo-joo, age 19, shot an opening round 61 (−10) and held on to total 273 (−11), one stroke ahead of runner-up Karrie Webb. Trailing by a stroke at the final tee, Kim sank a  putt for birdie while Webb failed to par from the same distance to force a playoff. It was Kim's first win on the LPGA Tour and she became the third-youngest in history to win a women's major title.

Field
The field for the tournament was set at 120, and most earned exemptions based on past performance on the Ladies European Tour, the LPGA Tour, or with a high ranking in the Women's World Golf Rankings.

There were 12 exemption categories for the 2014 Evian Championship.

1. The top 40 in the Women's World Golf Rankings, as of 12 August 2014
Chella Choi (7,12), Na Yeon Choi (12), Chun In-gee, Paula Creamer (2,4,12), Shanshan Feng (4,6,12), Caroline Hedwall (12), Charley Hull (5,6), Karine Icher (12), Jang Ha-na, Cristie Kerr (12), Kim Hyo-joo, I.K. Kim (5,12), Lydia Ko (4,7,12), Jessica Korda (4,12), Meena Lee (12), Mirim Lee (4,12), Stacy Lewis (4,7,12), Catriona Matthew (12), Azahara Muñoz (5,12), Anna Nordqvist (4,12), Se Ri Pak (7,12), Hee Young Park (12), Inbee Park (2,3,4,12), Suzann Pettersen (2,4,6,7,12), Pornanong Phatlum (5,12), Gerina Piller (12), Beatriz Recari (7,12), So Yeon Ryu (4,7,12), Lizette Salas (4,12), Jenny Shin (12), Angela Stanford (7,12), Lexi Thompson (3,4,7,12), Karrie Webb (2,4,5,12), Michelle Wie (3,4,12), Amy Yang (4,12), Sakura Yokomine
Eligible but did not play: Sun-Ju Ahn, Lee Bo-mee, Mo Martin (3,4,5,12), Jiyai Shin (2)

2. Active Evian Masters Champions
Laura Davies (12), Juli Inkster (12), Ai Miyazato (12)
Eligible but did not play: Natalie Gulbis

3. Winners of the 2014 majors (2014 Kraft Nabisco Championship, 2014 U.S. Women's Open, 2014 Women's British Open, 2014 LPGA Championship)
All players already qualified in other categories.

4. LPGA Tour winners since 2013 Evian
Austin Ernst (12)
Eligible but did not play: Teresa Lu

5. Ladies European Tour (LET) winners since 2013 Evian
Valentine Derrey, Julie Greciet, Trish Johnson, Mi Hyang Lee (12), Camilla Lennarth, Gwladys Nocera (6), Lee-Anne Pace (12), Florentyna Parker, Dewi Claire Schreefel (12), Thidapa Suwannapura (12), Kylie Walker, Cheyenne Woods

6. The top 5 on the LET Order of Merit, as of commitment date
Nikki Campbell

7. Top 10 and ties from the 2013 Evian Championship
Jennifer Johnson (12)

8. 2014 U.S. Women's Amateur champion
Kristen Gillman (a)

9. 2014 British Ladies Amateur champion
Emily Kristine Pedersen

10. Evian invitations (four)
Caroline Afonso, Céline Boutier (a), Joanna Klatten (12), Minjee Lee

11. Evian Pre-qualifiers
Ariane Provot, Jing Yan (a)

12. LPGA Tour money list, as of commitment date
Marina Alex, Amy Anderson, Christel Boeljon, Katie Burnett, Dori Carter, Carlota Ciganda, Laura Diaz, Paz Echeverria, Jodi Ewart Shadoff, Sandra Gal, Julieta Granada, Jaye Marie Green, Mina Harigae, Mi Jung Hur, Eun-Hee Ji, Tiffany Joh, Moriya Jutanugarn, Danielle Kang, Haeji Kang, Kim Kaufman, Sarah Kemp, Christina Kim, Katherine Kirk, Patcharajutar Kongkraphan, Candie Kung, Brittany Lang, Ilhee Lee, Jee Young Lee, Amelia Lewis, Xi Yu Lin, Brittany Lincicome, Pernilla Lindberg, Alejandra Llaneza, Caroline Masson, Kristy McPherson, Sydnee Michaels, Mika Miyazato, Belen Mozo, Haru Nomura, Ji Young Oh, Brooke Pancake, Jane Park, Morgan Pressel, Jennifer Rosales, Giulia Sergas, Alena Sharp, Ashleigh Simon, Sarah Jane Smith, Jennifer Song, Kris Tamulis, Kelly Tan, Yani Tseng, Ayako Uehara, Mariajo Uribe, Line Vedel, Alison Walshe, Lindsey Wright, Sun Young Yoo
Eligible but did not play: Yueer Cindy Feng

Past champion in the field

Pettersen was the first winner of this event since it has been a major

Nationalities in the field

Course

Source:

Round summaries

First round
Thursday, 11 September 2014

Second round
Friday, 12 September 2014

Third round
Saturday, 13 September 2014

Final round
Sunday, 14 September 2014

Source:

Scorecard
Final round

Cumulative tournament scores, relative to par
Source:

References

External links

Coverage on the Ladies European Tour's official site
Coverage on the LPGA Tour's official site

The Evian Championship
Golf tournaments in France
Evian Championship
Evian Championship
Evian Championship